Henry Sandys may refer to:
 Henry Sandys (MP) (–1640), English politician
 Henry Sandys, 5th Baron Sandys (died 1644), English nobleman and Cavalier officer
 Henry Sandys, 7th Baron Sandys

See also
 Sandys (surname)